Tebenna chodzhajevi is a moth in the family Choreutidae. It was described by Aleksey Maksimovich Gerasimov in 1930. It is found in the Uzbek region Bukhara (Samarkand, Kitab, Takhta Karacha Pass).

The larvae feed on Codonocephalum grande.

References

Choreutidae
Moths described in 1930